Chauvin is a census-designated place (CDP) in Terrebonne Parish, Louisiana, United States. The population was 2,575 in 2020.. It is part of the Houma–Bayou Cane–Thibodaux metropolitan statistical area.

Geography
Chauvin is located at  (29.447056, -90.593486). About 45 minutes southeast of Thibodaux Louisiana.

West of the village is the Bayou Chauvin Oil and Gas Field.

Demographics

As of the 2020 United States census, there were 2,575 people, 862 households, and 688 families residing in the CDP.

Notable people

Ray Authement, the fifth president of the University of Louisiana at Lafayette from 1974 to 2008 and the longest serving president of a public university in the United States, was born near Chauvin in 1928.
Leonard J. Chabert, member of both houses of the Louisiana State Legislature from Terrebonne and Lafourche parishes from 1972 to 1992, was born in Chauvin c. 1932.

References

External links

 Pitre history in Chauvin

Census-designated places in Louisiana
Census-designated places in Terrebonne Parish, Louisiana
Census-designated places in Houma – Thibodaux metropolitan area